HARC may refer to:

 Houston Advanced Research Center
 Herkimer ARC, a chapter of The Arc New York

See also
 Harc, a village in Tolna County, Hungary
 H:ARC, the shortcut to Help:Archiving a talk page